Roll is a populated place in central Yuma County, Arizona, United States.  It is part of the Yuma Metropolitan Statistical Area. Named for early settler John H. Roll, it lies along the lower Gila River in the Mohawk Valley, between the Yuma Proving Ground and the Barry M. Goldwater Air Force Range. It is located along the Union Pacific Railroad's Roll Industrial Lead. Local roads connect Roll to Interstate 8, east of the city of Yuma, the county seat of Yuma County.  Its elevation is 262 feet (80 m).  Although Roll is unincorporated, it has a post office. Roll has the ZIP Code of 85347; in the 2000 census, the population of the 85347 ZCTA was 1,235.

Roll is served by the Mohawk Valley Elementary School District. The historic Mohawk Valley School, which is located on 5151 South Ave. 39 East in Roll was listed in the National Register of Historic Places on December 29, 1986, reference: #86003525. The Wellton Mohawk Middle School is its sister school.

Images

References

Further reading
 Roll, Arizona history: http://www.rollroots.com/azmaps.htm

Unincorporated communities in Yuma County, Arizona
Unincorporated communities in Arizona